Derrick Shelby (born March 4, 1989) is a former American football defensive end. He was signed by the Miami Dolphins after going undrafted in 2012. He played college football at Utah.

College career
Shelby appeared in 47 games in his four-year career for the Utes and finished with 169 tackles. After his senior year, he was awarded 1st Team All-Pac-12.

Professional career

Miami Dolphins
Shelby was signed by the Miami Dolphins on April 29, 2012, after going undrafted in the 2012 NFL Draft. He played all sixteen games in his rookie season, recording eight tackles.

On September 8, 2013, Shelby recorded his first-career sack, which included a forced fumble against the Cleveland Browns. The next week on September 15, he would strip-sack Andrew Luck for his second sack and forced fumble on the season. On September 30, 2013, he made his first-career start in his second season against the New Orleans Saints. Shelby finished his second NFL season with a season-high 34 tackles, two forced fumbles and 2.5 sacks.

On September 28, 2014, Shelby recorded a career-high two sacks against the Oakland Raiders. On October 6, the Dolphins suspended Shelby indefinitely for poor conduct. He was reinstated on October 13. On October 19, he recorded his third sack of the season against the Chicago Bears. On December 21, Shelby recorded his first-career interception against the Minnesota Vikings, becoming the first Dolphins defensive lineman to intercept a pass since Randy Starks in 2012. He completed his third season with 26 tackles, a season-high three sacks, and his first interception.

On November 15, 2015, Shelby strip-sacked Sam Bradford in a 20-19 win against the Philadelphia Eagles, his third career strip-sack and first sack of the season. The next week on November 22, he recorded his second sack against the Dallas Cowboys. On December 6, Shelby picked off Baltimore Ravens' Matt Schaub and ran 22 yards for his first-career touchdown, becoming the first Dolphins defensive lineman to record an interception for a touchdown since Phillip Merling in 2008. On January 3, 2016, he dropped New England Patriots' Tom Brady for his third sack of the season. He ended his final season on the Dolphins with season-highs in tackles (37), sacks (3.5), as well as an interception, two forced fumbles, and a touchdown.

Atlanta Falcons
On March 9, 2016, Shelby signed a four-year, $21 million contract with the Atlanta Falcons. On October 18, 2016, he was placed on injured reserve with an Achilles injury. In the 2016 season, the Falcons would reach Super Bowl LI. However, Shelby could not participate due to his injury. Against the New England Patriots, the Falcons would fall in a 34–28 overtime defeat.

On October 1, 2017, Shelby knocked down Tyrod Taylor, receiving his first sack as a Falcon in a 17-23 loss to the Buffalo Bills. In his second season with the Falcons, he had 14 starts in 16 games, recording 30 tackles and a sack.

On March 2, 2018, Shelby was released by the Falcons. He was re-signed by the Falcons on March 22, 2018. He was placed on injured reserve on November 28, 2018, with a groin injury.

NFL statistics

References

External links
Utah Utes bio
Miami Dolphins bio

1989 births
Living people
American football defensive ends
Atlanta Falcons players
Miami Dolphins players
Players of American football from Houston
Utah Utes football players